Bachia trisanale, also known commonly as Stacy's bachia, is a species of lizard in the family Gymnophthalmidae. The species is endemic to South America. There are three recognized subspecies.

Geographic range
B. trisanale is found in Bolivia, Brazil, Colombia, Ecuador, and Peru.

Habitat
The preferred natural habitat of B. trisanale is forest.

Description
B. trisanale has very small rudimentary legs. Each front leg has three terminal tubercles instead of digits. The back legs are minute and styliform. There are three elongate parallel anal plates, to which the specific name refers. The tail is very long, longer than SVL.

Reproduction
B. trisanale is oviparous.

Subspecies
The following three subspecies are recognized as being valid, including the nominotypical subspecies.
Bachia trisanale abendrothii 
Bachia trisanale trisanale 
Bachia trisanale vermiformis 

Nota bene: A trinomial authority in parentheses indicates that the subspecies was originally described in a genus other than Bachia.

Etymology
The subspecific name, abendrothii, is in honor of German arachnologist Ernst Robert Abendroth (1810–1871).

References

Further reading
Cope ED (1868). "An Examination of the REPTILIA and BATRACHIA obtained by the Orton Expedition to Equador [sic] and the Upper Amazon, with notes on other Species". Proceedings of the Academy of Natural Sciences of Philadelphia 20: 96–140. (Ophiognomon trisanale, new species, pp. 100–101).

Bachia
Reptiles described in 1868
Taxa named by Edward Drinker Cope